Whipping Star is a 1970 science fiction novel by American writer Frank Herbert.  It is the first full-length novel set in the ConSentiency universe established by Herbert in his short stories “A Matter of Traces” and “The Tactful Saboteur”.

Plot summary 

In the far future, humankind has made contact with numerous other sentient species: Gowachin, Laclac, Wreaves, Pan Spechi, Taprisiots, and Caleban (among others) and has helped to form the ConSentiency to govern among the species.  After suffering under a tyrannous pure democracy which had the power to create laws so fast that no thought could be given to the effects, the sentients of the galaxy found the need for a Bureau of Sabotage (BuSab) to slow the wheels of government, thereby preventing it from legislating recklessly.

In Whipping Star, Jorj X. McKie is a saboteur extraordinary, a born troublemaker who has naturally become one of BuSab's best agents.  As the novel opens, it is revealed that Calebans, who are beings visible to other sentient species as stars, have been disappearing one by one.  Each disappearance is accompanied by millions of sentient deaths and instances of incurable insanity.

Ninety years prior to the setting of Whipping Star, the Calebans appeared and offered jumpdoors to the collective species, allowing sentients to travel instantly to any point in the universe.  Gratefully accepting, the sentiency didn't question the consequences.  Now Mliss Abnethe, a psychotic human female with immense power and wealth, has bound a Caleban (called Fannie Mae) in a contract that allows the Caleban to be whipped to death; when the Caleban dies, everyone who has ever used a jumpdoor (which is almost every adult in the sentient world and many of the young) will die as well.

The Calebans begin to disappear one at a time, leaving our plane of existence (or exiting "our wave") to save themselves.  As all Calebans are connected, if all were to remain in our existence, when Fannie Mae died, all Calebans would die.  As each Caleban exits, millions of the ConSentiency are killed or rendered insane.  McKie has to find Mliss and stop her before Fannie Mae reaches, in her words,  "ultimate discontinuity", but he is constrained by the law protecting private individuals by restricting the ministrations of BuSab to public entities.

McKie succeeds in saving Fannie Mae by opening a jumpdoor into space which shunts a large interstellar cloud of (presumably) hydrogen into her stellar body, rejuvenating her from her torture at the hands of the Palenki henchmen hired by Mliss Abnethe. Fannie Mae agreed to the contract with Abnethe in return for education. Calebans have great difficulty understanding and communicating with the more limited species of the ConSentiency (and vice versa), but Fannie Mae is curious. Abnethe's wealth provides the best tutors in exchange for Fannie Mae's agreement to take the whippings. Abnethe has an insane sadistic streak, but a court-mandated Clockwork Orange–style conditioning session leaves her unable to tolerate the suffering of others. Abnethe needs a Caleban to take the whippings because she still craves a way to satisfy her sadistic urges and Calebans do not broadcast their pain in a way that is easily recognized by other species.

Related works
Whipping Star was followed in 1977 by Herbert's The Dosadi Experiment and preceded by the short story "The Tactful Saboteur".   While these stories are not exactly related to Whipping Star, they take place in the same imaginary universe and have the same main character, Jorj X. McKie.

Chairdogs appear throughout the story and also are mentioned in multiple Dune novels; both the original series by Frank Herbert as well as the extended series by Brian Herbert and Kevin J. Anderson.

Main characters 

Jorj X. McKie - BuSab Saboteur Extraordinary - Human
Bildoon - BuSab Director - Pan Spechi
Fannie Mae - Caleban
Mliss Abnethe - wealthy female - human

References

External links
 
 

1970 American novels
Novels by Frank Herbert
1970 science fiction novels
American science fiction novels
ConSentiency universe
G. P. Putnam's Sons books